Finn Micheal Wolfhard (born December 23, 2002) is a Canadian actor and musician, known for playing the role of Mike Wheeler in the Netflix series Stranger Things (2016–present). He also played the roles of Richie Tozier in the horror film It (2017) and its sequel It: Chapter Two (2019), and has starred in the supernatural film Ghostbusters: Afterlife (2021).

As a musician, Wolfhard was the lead vocalist and guitarist for the rock band Calpurnia and since 2020, he is a member of The Aubreys. Wolfhard has since made his directorial debut with the comedy short film Night Shifts (2020).

Early life
Finn Micheal Wolfhard was born on December 23, 2002 in Vancouver, British Columbia, Canada, to a family of French, German, and Jewish descent. He attended Catholic school. His father, Eric Wolfhard, is a researcher on aboriginal land claims. He has an older brother, actor Nick Wolfhard.

Career 
Wolfhard got his first acting job from Craigslist. In 2014, he made his acting and television debut as Zoran in the second season of the post-apocalyptic science fiction series The 100. The following year, he appeared as Jordie Pinsky in the series Supernatural.

In 2016, Wolfhard began portraying Mike Wheeler in the Netflix series Stranger Things. He auditioned for the role via video after seeing an open casting call. Wolfhard, along with his castmates, won a SAG Award for Outstanding Performance by an Ensemble in a Drama Series. He and co-stars Noah Schnapp, Gaten Matarazzo, and Caleb McLaughlin competed against one another in a 2017 episode of Spike's Lip Sync Battle.

In July 2017, Wolfhard co-directed his first music video with Josh Ovalle for the band Spendtime Palace's song "Sonora".  Wolfhard made his feature film debut playing Richie Tozier in the 2017 film adaptation of Stephen King's It. The casting of Wolfhard in both Stranger Things and It, both set in the '80s, had been a coincidence. According to Wolfhard, he had been initially cast as Richie when Cary Fukunaga was attached as director and co-writer, but when Fukunaga left the project over creative differences, the role fell through which allowed him to pursue Stranger Things. Once Andy Muschietti became attached to It, Wolfhard had to re-audition for the role of Richie. In October 2017, Wolfhard parted ways with his former agency, APA, and fired former agent Tyler Grasham following allegations that Grasham had sexually assaulted aspiring young male actors. Wolfhard himself had not been assaulted. In January 2018, Wolfhard signed with talent agency, CAA. He played Tyler, an altruistic and thoughtful pizza delivery boy, in the 2018 Ken Marino-directed ensemble comedy film, Dog Days.

In January 2019, Wolfhard starred in the Netflix animated series Carmen Sandiego as "Player", the title character's chief accomplice and friend. In May, he made his modeling debut in Saint Laurent's Fall/Winter '19 campaign. He reprised his role as young Richie in flashbacks for the sequel It Chapter Two (2019), and co-starred in The Goldfinch (2019), the John Crowley-directed adaptation of Donna Tartt's novel, playing Young Boris Pavlikovsky, a Ukrainian student and troublemaker. Wolfhard had not been Crowley's first choice as he wanted to cast an authentic Russian actor for Boris, but Wolfhard's near perfect Russian accent in his audition helped him get the role. Wolfhard also provided the voice of Pugsley Addams in an animated remake of The Addams Family. From 2017 to 2019, he was listed in Variety’s Hollywood Youth Impact Report. In 2018 and 2019, The Hollywood Reporter named him as one of the top 30 stars under age 18.

In January 2020, Wolfhard portrayed Miles in the supernatural horror film The Turning, an adaptation of Henry James' novella The Turn of the Screw, and co-starred in the anthology film Omniboat: A Fast Boat Fantasia (2020). Wolfhard then starred in the Jeremy Schaulin-Rioux–directed short film, Rules for Werewolves (2020), based on playwright and novelist Kirk Lynn's adapted screenplay from his debut novel, which is set to become a feature-length film with Wolfhard attached to star. He lent his voice to two Adult Swim productions: the animated special, Smiling Friends and the animated series JJ Villard's Fairy Tales as Boypunzel, a gender-swapped version of Rapunzel. Wolfhard joined the Jason Reitman–directed comedy miniseries Home Movie: The Princess Bride, which raised money for World Central Kitchen, and performed a live reading of The Princess Brides script, as the Grandson, for a Democratic Party of Wisconsin charity event in September 2020.

At the age of 17, Wolfhard made his directorial debut with the comedy short film, Night Shifts (2020). He released the film on YouTube the following year. Wolfhard co-starred in the Audible Original, When You Finish Saving the World (2020), written by Jesse Eisenberg. He narrates Ziggy Katz, a 15-year-old boy recording audio sessions to a futuristic bot therapist. The audiobook was adapted by Eisenberg into the comedy-drama film When You Finish Saving the World (2022), with Julianne Moore and Wolfhard starring as mother and son. In July 2020, it was announced that Wolfhard and his brother, Nick Wolfhard, would be headlining the voice cast of sci-fi animated series NEW-GEN, playing twin brothers. Wolfhard was included in Forbes 30 Under 30 class of 2020 in the field of Hollywood and entertainment.

Wolfhard co-starred with Carrie Coon in Jason Reitman's Ghostbusters: Afterlife (2021), playing the son of Coon's single mother. He was cast alongside Willem Dafoe, Emily Watson, and Helena Zengel in A24's fantasy epic The Legend of Ochi, directed by Isaiah Saxon. In November 2021, he announced that he is working on directing a feature-length film.  Wolfhard also joined Guillermo del Toro's stop-motion animated musical film, Pinocchio (2022).

Music
Wolfhard was the lead vocalist, rhythm guitarist and songwriter for Vancouver-based rock band Calpurnia, until the band dissolved in November 2019. A few weeks later, it was announced that Wolfhard's new band, The Aubreys, with Calpurnia drummer Malcolm Craig, would debut on the soundtrack of his film, The Turning (2020). The Aubreys released their single, "Loved One" on March 10, 2020, and their debut EP, Soda & Pie, through AWAL, on March 13, 2020. Their next single, "Smoke Bomb" was released on August 17, 2020. The Aubreys' first collaboration single with Lunar Vacation, "No Offerings" was released on January 12, 2021. Their second single of 2021, "Sand in My Bed" was released on February 14.

The Aubreys released their single "Karaoke Alone" on September 10, 2021 from the group's debut studio LP, Karaoke Alone, which was released on November 5, 2021.

Advocacy
Wolfhard has been involved in advocacy for autism and indigenous children.

In May 2017, Wolfhard hosted "Strange 80s," a benefit concert to raise funds for Sweet Relief, an organization that helps struggling musicians in need of medical care. He also performed three tracks with his former band Calpurnia at the event. For his work with Sweet Relief, he received an award at the 2017 Television Industry Advocacy Awards.

Filmography

Film

Television

Web series

Music videos

Podcasts

Audiobooks

Discography

Albums
With the Aubreys

Extended plays
With the Aubreys

Singles
With the Aubreys
 "Getting Better (Otherwise)" (2020)
 "Loved One" (2020)
 "Smoke Bomb" (2020)
 "No Offerings" (2021) with Lunar Vacation
 "Sand in My Bed" (2021)
 "Karoke Alone" (2021)

Accolades

References

External links

 

Living people
21st-century Canadian male actors
21st-century Canadian male singers
Canadian male child actors
Canadian male film actors
Canadian male television actors
Canadian male voice actors
Canadian rock singers
Canadian people of French descent
Canadian people of German descent
Canadian people of Jewish descent
Canadian folk-pop singers
Canadian rock guitarists
Jewish Canadian musicians
Male actors from Vancouver
Musicians from Vancouver
2002 births